Siliguri Assembly constituency is an assembly constituency in Darjeeling district in the Indian state of West Bengal.

Overview
As per orders of the Delimitation Commission, No. 26 Siliguri Assembly constituency covers ward nos. 1 to 30 and 45 to 47 of Siliguri Municipal Corporation.

Siliguri Assembly constituency is part of No. 4 Darjeeling (Lok Sabha constituency).

Members of Legislative Assembly

Ward Nos. 31 to 44 of Siliguri municipal corporation are covered by Dabgram-Phulbari Assembly constituency

Election results

2021 Election

In the 2021 West Bengal Legislative Assembly election, Shankar Ghosh of BJP defeated his nearest rival Omprakash Mishra of TMC.

2016 Election

In the 2016 West Bengal Legislative Assembly election, Ashok Bhattacharya of CPI(M) defeated his nearest rival Bhaichung Bhutia of TMC.

2011 Election

In the 2011 West Bengal Legislative Assembly election, Rudra Nath Bhattacharya of TMC defeated his nearest rival Ashok Bhattacharya of CPI(M).

1977-2006
In the 2006, 2001, 1996 and 1991 state assembly elections, Ashok Bhattacharya of CPI(M) won the Siliguri assembly seat defeating Nantu Paul of Congress, Prasanta Nandy of Trinamool Congress, Sankar Malakar of Congress and Prasanta Nandy of Congress, respectively. Contests in most years were multi cornered but only winners and runners are being mentioned. Gour Chakraborty of CPI(M) defeated Prasanta Nandy of Congress in 1987. Biren Bose of CPI(M) defeated Krishnendra Narayan Chowdhury and Arun Kumar Moitra, both of Congress, in 1982 and 1977, respectively.

1951–1972
Arun Kumar Moitra of Congress won in 1972 and 1971. Prem Thapa of IGL won in 1969. Arun Kumar Moitra of Congress won in 1967. Jagadish Chandra Bhattacharjee of Congress won in 1962. In 1957, the Siliguri seat was a joint seat with one reserved for scheduled tribes. Satendra Narayan Mazumdar of CPI and Tenzing Wangdi of Congress won in 1957. In independent India's first election in 1951 Kurseong-Siliguri was a joint seat. Tenzing Wangdi of Congress and George Mahbert, Independent, won in 1951.

References

Assembly constituencies of West Bengal
Politics of Darjeeling district
Siliguri